Chryston is a village in North Lanarkshire, around  east of Glasgow, in Scotland. It lies north of its sister village, Muirhead, which is on the A80. The village has around double Muirhead's population, although the exact boundary between the two modern villages is difficult to find.

History
 

 The etymology of the name is uncertain but may refer to the "town of Cristinus". Several old documents show Chryston with various spellings including maps by Timothy Pont, William Forrest, Thomas Richardson, and William Roy.

In the 18th century, Chryston had one of the four schools in the parish of Cadder. William Barclay, himself a school teacher, reported the low pay of his profession in the Old Statistical Account.

One gazetteer, Samuel Lewis, from around 1846, describes a recently established library. He quotes 555 inhabitants. The same publication also stated that Chyston was a quoad sacra parish including the villages of Mollinsburn, Moodiesburn, Muirhead and the hamlet of Auchinloch. Even today Moodiesburn is often included in the Chryston district: Devro headquarters has Chryston as its official address, and Moodiesburn's Stoneyetts Hospital (originally part of East Muckcroft within the "Woodilee Estate") was sometimes listed under Chryston. As with Muirhead, children born of Moodiesburn citizens have Chryston as their birth district on their birth certificate.

Chryston Parish Church serves the villages of Chryston, Moodiesburn and Muirhead and has churches in Chryston and Moodiesburn.

On Friday 18 September 1959, 47 miners lost their lives in the Auchengeich mining disaster at nearby Auchengeich Colliery.

Chryston High School is a six-year non-denominational secondary school situated on Lindsaybeg Road.

Demography
Groome's Gazetteer gives historical statistics including population. The 1891 and 1901 statistics include Muirhead.

See also
List of places in North Lanarkshire

References

External links

 local information site

Villages in North Lanarkshire
Greater Glasgow